The Train I'm On was the fifth album released by Tony Joe White, and the second he released for Warner Brothers. It was produced by Jerry Wexler and Tom Dowd and recorded in 1972 at Muscle Shoals Sound Studio, Muscle Shoals, Alabama.

Track listing
All tracks composed by Tony Joe White, except where indicated
Side One
 "I've Got a Thing About You Baby" 2:42
 "The Family" 	(John Hurley, Ronnie Wilkins) 3:30
 "If I Ever Saw a Good Thing" 	3:21
 "Beouf River Road" 3:20
 "The Train I'm On" 3:09
 "Even Trolls Love Rock and Roll" 4:56

Side Two
 "As the Crow Flies" 3:50
 "Take Time to Love" 	(Donnie Fritts, Tony Joe White) 3:02
 "300 Pounds of Hongry" (Donnie Fritts, Eddie Hinton) 2:44
 "The Migrant" 4:00
 "Sidewalk Hobo" 3:54
 "The Gospel Singer" 3:32

Personnel
Tony Joe White - guitar, harmonica
Tippy Armstrong - guitar
John Hughey - pedal steel guitar
David Hood - bass
Roger Hawkins - drums
Barry Beckett - piano, clavinet, organ
Ronnie Barron - organ, electric piano, vibes, congas
Charles Chalmers - saxophone
String arrangements by Arif Mardin
Background vocal arrangements by Tom Dowd
Background vocals:
Charles Chalmers
Donna Rhodes
Sandy Rhodes
Terry Woodford
George Soulé
Jerry Masters

References

1972 albums
Tony Joe White albums
Albums arranged by Arif Mardin
Albums produced by Jerry Wexler
Albums produced by Tom Dowd
Swamp rock albums
Warner Records albums